Albert Wesley Lakeman (December 31, 1918 – May 25, 1976), nicknamed "Moose", was a professional baseball catcher. He played in Major League Baseball for the Cincinnati Reds, Philadelphia Phillies, Boston Braves and Detroit Tigers. He was born in Cincinnati, Ohio.

The light-hitting Lakeman was a fine defensive catcher as he took responsibility for getting the most out of his pitchers. For most of his nine-year career in the Majors, he was an efficient, reliable backup playing behind Ray Mueller (Reds) and Andy Seminick (Phillies). His most productive season came in 1945 with Cincinnati, when he posted career-highs in games played (76, including 72 games as starting backstop as the Reds' most-used catcher), batting average (.256), home runs (eight), RBI (31) and runs (22).

In a nine-season career, Lakeman was a .203 hitter with 131 hits, 15 home runs and 66 RBI in 239 games. After his playing career ended, he managed in the Tigers' farm system (1956–62; 1965–66; 1970) and served two terms as the bullpen coach at the Major League level for the Boston Red Sox (1963–64; 1967–69), and was a member of the 1967 American League champions.

Lakeman died in Spartanburg, South Carolina, at age 57.

References

External links

 

1918 births
1976 deaths
Baltimore Orioles (IL) players
Baseball players from Cincinnati
Boston Braves players
Boston Red Sox coaches
Buffalo Bisons (minor league) players
Cincinnati Reds players
Columbia Reds players
Columbus Jets players
Detroit Tigers players
Durham Bulls managers
Erie Sailors players
Idaho Falls Russets players
Indianapolis Indians players
Major League Baseball bullpen coaches
Major League Baseball catchers
Milwaukee Brewers (minor league) players
Milwaukee Brewers scouts
Panama City Fliers players
Sportspeople from Spartanburg, South Carolina
Philadelphia Phillies players
Sacramento Solons players
Syracuse Chiefs players
Toronto Maple Leafs (International League) players
Union City Greyhounds players